The Mandaue City Council (Filipino: Sangguniang Panlungsod ng Mandaue) is Mandaue's Sangguniang Panlungsod, a local legislative body. It is composed of 10 elected members as City Councilors. And 2 other members being the President of the Association of Barangay Captains (ABC) and the President of the Sangguniang Kabataan (SK) or Youth Council.

Current members
These are the members after the 2019 local elections:

Past members

References

Politics of Mandaue
City councils in the Philippines